Brandon Quintin Adams (born August 22, 1979) is an American actor, known for having played Jesse Hall in the first two Mighty Ducks movies and Kenny DeNunez in The Sandlot. He also played in the 1989 film Polly as Jimmy Bean.

Career 
Adams has also appeared in The Fresh Prince of Bel-Air, A Different World, Moesha, Sister, Sister (TV series), Martin, Michael Jackson's Moonwalker where he played Zeke in the "Smooth Criminal" segment and Young Michael in the "Badder" segment, a parody of Jackson's classic video for "Bad", and was the leading actor in Wes Craven's The People Under the Stairs. He also provided the voice of Rai in Kingdom Hearts II.

Filmography

Film

Television

Video games

References

External links 

1979 births
Living people
Actors from Topeka, Kansas
Male actors from Kansas
African-American male actors
African-American male child actors
American male child actors
American male film actors
American male television actors
American male voice actors
American male video game actors
20th-century American male actors
21st-century American male actors
20th-century African-American people
21st-century African-American people